Anthony “Fish” Smithson (born March 18, 1994) is a former American football free safety. He played college football at the University of Kansas. He was signed by the Washington Redskins as an undrafted free agent in 2017. He also played for the Baltimore Ravens.

College career

Hartnell
Smithson initially committed to play at Hartnell College out of high school where he played his freshman year.

Kansas
Following his freshman year at Hartnell, he transferred to the University of Kansas. In 2015, he led the nation in solo tackles, which led to him being named Second-team All-Big 12. In 2016 he was named First-team All-Big 12.

Professional career

Washington Redskins
After going undrafted in the 2017 NFL Draft, Smithson signed with the Washington Redskins as an undrafted free agent. He was waived on September 2, 2017 during roster cutdowns. The following day, he was signed to the Redskins' practice squad. He was elevated to the active roster on December 19, 2017.

On September 1, 2018, Smithson was waived for final roster cuts before the start of the 2018 season.

Arizona Cardinals
On December 19, 2018, Smithson was signed to the Arizona Cardinals practice squad. He was released six days later.

Los Angeles Chargers
On January 3, 2019, Smithson was signed to the Los Angeles Chargers practice squad.

Jacksonville Jaguars
On July 25, 2019, Smithson signed with the Jacksonville Jaguars, but was waived on August 4.

Baltimore Ravens
On August 27, 2019, Smithson signed with the Baltimore Ravens. He was placed on injured reserve on August 31, 2019 and was released on March 18, 2020.

Personal life
Smithson's brother, Antoine "Shaky" Smithson, played wide receiver at the University of Utah and was signed as an undrafted free agent by the Green Bay Packers in 2011 but was shortly released off of injured reserve with an injury settlement. His nickname "Fish" was given to him by his grandmother as a child due to his fear of fish.

References

External links
Kansas football profile
Washington Redskins bio

1994 births
Living people
Players of American football from Baltimore
American football safeties
Hartnell Panthers football players
Kansas Jayhawks football players
Washington Redskins players
Arizona Cardinals players
Los Angeles Chargers players
Jacksonville Jaguars players
Baltimore Ravens players